In enzymology, a mannose isomerase is an enzyme that catalyzes the chemical reaction

D-mannose  D-fructose

Hence, this enzyme has one substrate, D-mannose, and one product, D-fructose.

This enzyme belongs to the family of isomerases, specifically those intramolecular oxidoreductases interconverting aldoses and ketoses.  The systematic name of this enzyme class is D-mannose aldose-ketose-isomerase. Other names in common use include D-mannose isomerase, and D-mannose ketol-isomerase.  This enzyme participates in fructose and mannose metabolism.

References 

 

EC 5.3.1
Enzymes of unknown structure